The Thyreocoridae are a family of shield bugs, known by common names that include negro bugs or ebony bugs. Historically, a few authors have called this family "Corimelaenidae" (e.g.), but the name Thyreocoridae, published in 1843, has nomenclatural priority over Corimelaenidae, published in 1872. Other classifications have placed them as a subfamily within the broad family Cydnidae.

Genera
There has been disagreement about how to treat subfamilies within the Thyreocoridae.

Alkindus Distant, 1889
Amyssonotum Horváth, 1919
Carrabas Distant, 1908
Corimelaena White, 1839
Cydnoides Malloch, 1919
Eumetopia Westwood, 1838
Galgupha Amyot & Serville, 1843
Godmania Horváth, 1919
Pericrepis Horváth, 1919
Pruhleria McAtee & Malloch, 1933
Strombosoma Amyot & Serville, 1843
Thyreocoris Schrank, 1801

References

Shield bugs
Heteroptera families